Bolivar is an unincorporated community in Bartow County, in the U.S. state of Georgia.

History
Bolivar had its start as a depot on the Louisville and Nashville Railroad. A post office called Bolivar was established in 1888, and closed in 1901. The community was named for Simón Bolívar, a Venezuelan statesman and military leader who led several South American nations to independence from the Spanish Empire.

References

Unincorporated communities in Bartow County, Georgia
Unincorporated communities in Georgia (U.S. state)